James Halyburton  (died 1765) of Pitcur in Angus and Firth, Orkney was a Scottish soldier and politician.

The oldest son of James Halyburton of Pitcur (died 1747), he joined the British Army in 1721 as an ensign in the 13th Foot, rising to the rank of Lieutenant-Colonel in 1750.

At the 1747 general election Halyburton was returned by his brother-in-law the 15th Earl of Morton  as the Member of Parliament (MP) for Orkney and Shetland.  He held the seat until the 1754 election.

References 

Year of birth missing
1765 deaths
James
People from Angus, Scotland
People from Orkney
Somerset Light Infantry officers
Members of the Parliament of Great Britain for Scottish constituencies
British MPs 1747–1754